The anime series Guin Saga is based on the novel series of the same name by Kaoru Kurimoto.  The series is directed by Atsushi Wakabayashi, his first directing role, and produced by Satelight. The screenplay for all the episodes was written by Shōji Yonemura, and the entire series was storyboarded by Atsushi Wakabayashi. The episodes follow a mysterious warrior, Guin, who has the head of a leopard.  He meets an ousted young prince and princess and helps them, while trying to recover his memories.

Kurimoto had been approached several times to permit an adaptation of Guin Saga but refused, as she felt that the story needed to be live-action and produced with Caucasian actors. On April 12, 2005, Micott & Basara (Japanese investors) announced plans to create an anime based on Guin Saga. On April 3, 2009 an English-dubbed trailer was posted on the anime's official website.  The 26 episodes of the Guin Saga anime aired from April 5, 2009 - September 27, 2009 on NHK BS-2.  The episodes were later released as 9 DVDs from between July 22, 2009 and March 24, 2010.  On May 7, 2010, North American anime licensor Sentai Filmworks announced that they acquired the series.  It released the first DVD, comprising the first thirteen episodes, on March 29, 2011, and the second on May 31, 2011.

The anime is scored by Nobuo Uematsu, his first full soundtrack for an anime series.  It uses two pieces of theme music.  by Nobuo Uematsu is the series' opening theme, while "Saga~This is my road" by Kanon is the series' ending theme.

Episode list

Volume DVDs
The episodes were released as a nine DVD limited edition set from between July 22, 2009 and March 24, 2010.

Japanese releases

North American release
Sentai Filmworks released the English subtitled version of the series in two hybrid DVD compilations which contain thirteen episodes each.

References
General references

Specific references

Guin Saga